The Graham Charity Cup was an association football competition. It was open to clubs in the East End of Glasgow, Scotland. It was a short-lived competition that lasted between 1888 and 1893.

History 

The competition was instituted by Mr John D. Graham for the benefit of charities in the East End of Glasgow. Graham was a board member of Clyde FC and the Scottish Football Association.

The competition was organized by the Graham Charity Committee (GCC). The committee consisted of a President, a Vice president, a Treasurer, and a Secretary.

The competition had a rule that debarred players from assisting other clubs so long as their own team was still in the running for the trophy.

No competition was held in 1891–92.

Results

1887–88

1888–89

1889–90

1890–91

1892–93

Notes

References

External links 
Graham Charity Cup (1887–91) Scottish-Football-Historical-Archive.

Defunct football cup competitions in Scotland
Charity events in the United Kingdom
Charity football matches
Recurring sporting events established in 1888
Recurring sporting events disestablished in 1891
1888 establishments in Scotland
1891 disestablishments in Scotland